Georg "Rector" Schick (February 25, 1831 – January 3, 1915) was a German-American Lutheran pastor, scholar, and professor of classical languages.

He was one of the first Rectors (Headmaster) of the Concordia College in St. Louis, Missouri.

Life

Early years
Georg Schick was born in Bad Homburg vor der Höhe on February 25, 1831. Having shown signs of unusual talents, he was permitted to enter to the Gymnasium at Frankfurt-am-Main for his secondary education. He was confirmed under , who was a Lutheran pastor and composer of hymns.

University education
Schick matriculated from Heidelberg University on May 10, 1851. He also did coursework at the Friedrich Wilhelm University in Berlin, and at the University of Erlangen. He sat for his examinations and passed with special honors on July 29, 1851.

Immigration
In the mid 19th century in Germany, a clergyman named Wilhelm Löhe made public appeals regarding the shortage of German-speaking Lutheran clergy in North America. Moved by these appeals, Schick moved to the United States.

Pastor at Emmanuel Church in Chicago
On September 10, 1854, Schick was installed as pastor at the Immanuel Church in Chicago, Illinois. He served the congregation there for two years until he was sent to Concordia College in St. Louis to teach classical languages.

Teacher at Concordia College
On March 31, 1856, Schick was installed as Conrector (vice-principal) along with Director Professor Biewend at Concordia College in St. Louis. C. F. W. Walther spoke at the ceremony. However in the spring of 1858, Biewend became ill and died on April 10. Schick took up the teaching position vacated by Biewend's death while Subrector Saxon assumed the administrative duties. Later in his life, Schick would be known by his students and colleges as "Rector", in recognition of his leadership after Biewend's death. Schick moved with the college when it was relocated to Fort Wayne, Indiana, due to the turmoil of the Civil War. He began teaching in Fort Wayne on September 9, 1861, and would remain a teacher at the institution until his death in 1915.

Legacy
Schick Street in Fort Wayne is named in his honor. The street formed the western border of the Concordia College campus and now bisects the campus of Indiana Tech, which purchased the campus when the college closed.

Several of Schick's students achieved significance as scholars, including Ernest G. Sihler, a prominent classicist.

References

1831 births
1915 deaths
People from Bad Homburg vor der Höhe
19th-century American Lutheran clergy
German emigrants to the United States
Lutheran Church–Missouri Synod people